Jhanji Hemnath Sarma College is a college situated at Jhanji, Sivasagar, Assam, India. It was founded on 25 July 1964. The college is affiliated to Dibrugarh University and recognized by University Grants Commission.

History 
Jhanji HNS College was established on 25 July 1964. Some of the educated people of Jhanji tried to establish an institute of higher education at the rural area. One of them is Hemnath Sarma. Initially the name of the college was Jhanji College. It was inaugurated by the great scholar, linguist Jogiraj Basu. Jhanji Hemnath Sarma College was established with the sole objective of bringing quality and higher education on the doorsteps of the economically backward agricultural belt of Jhanji. Maintenance of discipline in all spheres of activity has been the primary objective of the college since its inception. Holding of regular classes throughout the academic session is one important aspect in this regard.

Departments

The college has the following humanities departments:  Assamese, Economics, Education,  English, History, Political Science, Philosophy, Geography, Sanskrit, Sociology, and the Commerce stream.

Facilities

The college's infrastructure is modern with all well-equipped facilities.
 Hostel Facilities: The college has two on-campus hostel facility for girls and boys. It is run under the supervision of a hostel superintendent.
Laboratory Facilities: The college has a well-equipped computer Internet centre with short-term computer courses for the benefit of the students under the guidance of trained personnel.
Library: The library has more than 17,000 books related to the academic subjects and a wide range of national journals, newspapers, and periodicals.
Classroom Facilities: All the classrooms of the college are well furnished with modern facilities.
Canteen: One broad canteen with good and hygienic foods in a very scientific environment with comfortable seating.

Uniform

Boys wear white shirts and blue pants. Girls wear red blouses, muga mekhela, red chadar with white border or white chalwar and kurta and red dupatta.

Courses
The college offers:
 Two-year higher secondary course, Arts and Commerce (under AHSEC)
 B.A. and B.Com. semester system (Dibrugarh University)
 Computer courses
 Postgraduate courses

Publications
The college publishes the annual magazine ABHIJATRI.
SWARNASMRITI was published as a golden jubilee special magazine in 2014.
YATRA is published annually edited by the teachers.
 AVAGUNTHAN, a book on women related issues (ISBN No-978-93-82030-75-1) was published on 31 May 2014
KALLOLINI was published by the Girls' Hostel as a golden jubilee special magazine.
UTTARAN a collection of articles of the ISHAN UDAY SCHOLARSHIP holders of the college.

Notable alumni
Late Lalit Chandra Rajkhowa, former transport minister, Government of Assam
Shyamkanu Mahanta, IAS
Debeswar Borah, ACS
Ajit Kumar Bhuyan, Indian journalist and editor of the Prag News and Rajya Sabha MP from Assam State.

References

External links

Universities and colleges in Assam
Sivasagar district
Educational institutions established in 1964
1964 establishments in Assam
Dibrugarh